The Sir Edmund Hillary Outdoor Pursuits Centre of New Zealand (OPC) renamed Hillary Outdoors Education Centres, is a New Zealand-based not-for-profit trust with two centres in the North Island. Founded in 1972 by Graeme Dingle with Edmund Hillary as patron, OPC has been delivering outdoor programmes to school age students for 40 years and has around 5000 students visits per year.

Canyon Tragedy 

On 15 April 2008 heavy rain caused a rapid increase in the river level in the Mangatepopo River canyon where a school group was canyoning.  Seven people including six students and one teacher died. Later investigations revealed that the OPC missed heavy weather warnings from MetService and the coronal investigation that followed revealed systemic problems in risk management, including a culture of "risk drift" wherein the level of risk in the activities undertaken gradually increased over time.

Since the tragedy, the OPC has made significant changes to their practices, including enhanced training of the staff, making sure to check other staffs day plans, and ensuring that risky activities are carried out by more than a single staff member.  It also appears from the list of activities on the OPC website that canyoning is no longer one of the activities.

Geography

OPC Great Barrier 
OPC Great Barrier is situated on Great Barrier Island which is 100 km to the North East of Auckland central. The centre is based in Karaka Bay in the northern end of the Island.

OPC Tongariro 
OPC Tongariro is situated adjacent to the Tongariro National Park in the Central Plateau of the North Island right on State Highway 47 halfway between National Park and Turangi. The centre itself is on Department of Conservation (DOC) land in the Tongariro National Park.

References 

Department of Conservation consent to operate http://www.doc.govt.nz/getting-involved/consultations/closed/sir-edmund-hillary-outdoor-pursuits-centre-trust-concession-notification/
New Zealand Qualifications Authority certification http://www.nzqa.govt.nz/providers/details.do?providerId=961925001
Sir Edmund Hillary Outdoor Pursuits Centre Environmental Award http://www.odt.co.nz/news/dunedin/23159/award-recognises-passion-rivers
The Performance of Tertiary Education Providers http://www.tec.govt.nz/Reports/2009/The-Sir-Edmund-Hillary-Outdoor-Pursuits-Centre-of-New-Zealand.pdf
University Course Information http://www.uniguru.co.in/studyabroad/newzealand-courses/opc-certificate-outdoor-adventure-skills-leadership-course-details/cseid/51721580/cid/142464/programs.html
Sir Edmund Hillary Foundation https://web.archive.org/web/20100302033020/http://www.thesiredmundhillaryfoundation.ca/Sir-Edmund-Hillary.30.0.html
Graeme Dingle Founder of OPC - http://www.bookcouncil.org.nz/Writers/Profiles/Dingle,%20Graeme
South Island Get2Go coverage http://www.ch9.co.nz/node/15770

Educational organisations based in New Zealand
Education in the Auckland Region
Education in Manawatū-Whanganui
Edmund Hillary
1972 establishments in New Zealand